Ja-Ela Urban Council (JUC) is the local authority for the town of Ja-Ela in Gampaha District Sri Lanka. JUC is responsible for providing a variety of local public services including roads, sanitation, drains, housing, libraries, public parks and recreational facilities.

References

Ja-Ela
Local authorities in Western Province, Sri Lanka
Urban councils of Sri Lanka